Benedict G. Rousselle, known as Benny Rousselle (born January 20, 1951), is a Realtor and an Independent politician from Plaquemines Parish in Greater New Orleans, Louisiana.

From 1996 to 1999, Rousselle served District 105 in the Louisiana House of Representatives, which then encompassed Jefferson, Plaquemines, and Lafourche parishes. From 1987-1994, he served on the Plaquemines Parish Council. After leaving the state House, Rousselle returned to the Plaquemines Parish government as its elected president from 1999 to 2007. He handily unseated incumbent parish president Clyde Giordano in the 1998 general election.

Rousselle graduated from Belle Chasse High School in Belle Chasse in Plaquemines Parish. He obtained a Bachelor of Arts degree from the University of New Orleans. He has been affiliated with the Plaquemines Parish Council on Aging and the Louisiana Association of Realtors. Rousselle is Roman Catholic.

Plaquemines Parish is adjacent to the Algiers district (also known as Fifteenth Ward) of New Orleans. Hurricane Katrina struck Plaquemines Parish during Rousselle's second term as parish president. Katrina and related levee failures resulted in almost all homes and businesses of Plaquemines Parish being catastrophically flooded. Belle Chasse, the location of the Naval Air Station and the Joint Reserve Base, was spared from flood destruction as it is flanked by the Mississippi River on the northern and eastern sides and the Industrial Canal on the west side and naturally sits on high ground. Most had to evacuate permanently from their houses, and many remained for months in Federal Emergency Management Agency trailers.

Rousselle blamed the national administration for the way it handled the aftermath of Katrina.
Other politicians who criticized the way the U.S. government handled the aftermath of Hurricane Katrina were Mayor Ray Nagin of New Orleans and parish presidents  Junior Rodriguez from St. Bernard and Aaron Broussard from Jefferson.

Rousselle was constitutionally ineligible for a third consecutive term as Plaquemines parish president.

Election history

Member of Parish Council, District 2, 1990

Threshold > 50%

First Ballot, October 6, 1990

State Representative, 105th Representative District, 1995

Threshold > 50%

First Ballot, October 21, 1995

Second Ballot, November 18, 1995

Plaquemines Parish President, 1998

Threshold > 50%

First Ballot, October 3, 1998

Plaquemines Parish President, 2002

Threshold > 50%

First Ballot, October 5, 2002

Second Ballot, November 5, 2002

References

Sources

ThinkExist.com : 

Louisiana Secretary of State : https://web.archive.org/web/20060911211304/http://www.sos.louisiana.gov/

Plaquemines Parish: http://www.plaqueminesparish.com/

Democratic Party members of the Louisiana House of Representatives
Presidents of Plaquemines Parish, Louisiana
People from Belle Chasse, Louisiana
Politicians from New Orleans
1951 births
Living people
Catholics from Louisiana